Richard Hosking (31 March 1933 – 19 November 2019) was an Australian-born graduate of the University of Cambridge, who worked at the British Museum and later was Emeritus Professor of Sociology and English at Hiroshima Shudo University. He lived in London from the time of his retirement in 1998, and was a distinguished writer on Japanese food. His best known works were A Dictionary of Japanese Food: ingredients and culture (1996) and At the Japanese table (2000). He was a regular participant at the Oxford Symposium on Food and Cookery and edited five annual volumes of its proceedings. He died in London on 19 November 2019.

Works 
 1996 : A Dictionary of Japanese Food: ingredients and culture. Totnes: Prospect Books
 2000 : At the Japanese Table. New York: Oxford University Press

 as editor
 2004  : Nurture: proceedings of the Oxford Symposium on Food and Cookery, 2003. Footwork. 
 2006  : Wild Food: proceedings of the Oxford Symposium on Food and Cookery, 2004. Prospect Books.  Text on Google Books
 2006  : Authenticity in the Kitchen: proceedings of the Oxford Symposium on Food and Cookery, 2005. Prospect Books.  Text on Google Books
 2007  : Eggs in Cookery: proceedings of the Oxford Symposium on Food and Cookery, 2006. Prospect Books.  Text on Google Books
 2010 : Food and language: proceedings of the Oxford Symposium on Food and Cookery, 2009. Prospect Books.  Text on Google Books

References 

English food writers
British Japanologists
Alumni of the University of Cambridge
Living people
1933 births